The collared rock gecko (Pristurus collaris) is a species of lizard in the Sphaerodactylidae family found in Saudi Arabia and Yemen.

It is an oviparous animal, meaning that it reproduces by laying eggs.

It is also quite a small animal. The average size of a collared rock gecko is about 52mm from the snout to its vent.

References

Pristurus collaris. The Reptile Database. (n.d.). Retrieved March 18, 2022, from https://reptile-database.reptarium.cz/species?genus=Pristurus&species=collaris&search_param=%28%28taxon%3D 

Pristurus
Reptiles described in 1867